The former French Catholic diocese of Senlis existed from the sixth century, at least, to the French Revolution. Its see was at Senlis, in the modern department of Oise, in northern France.

It was suppressed by the Concordat of 1801, its territory passing to the diocese of Beauvais.

Bishops

To 1000

 Saint Rieul (Regulus)
 Nicenus (?)
 Mansuetus (?)
 Venustus (?)
 Tanitus (?)
 Jocundus (?)
 Protatus (or Protritus) (?)
 Modestus (?)
 c. 511-513: Saint Levain (Levangius, Livanianus)
 513-519: Passif (Passivus)
 519-547: Nonnullus
 Hodiernus (Fredigernus, Frodigerius) (?)
 c. 549-c. 557: Heiliger Gonotigerne (or Gonotigernus)
 Saint Sanctin (Sanctinus)
 c. 584: Saint Maculphe (or Malulfus)
 Saint Léthard (Letardus), sixth century
 Saint Candide (or Candidus) (?) sixth century
 625-c. 649: Saint Agomer (or Agmarus)
 652-c. 685: Saint Ausbert (or Autbertus)
 Saint Amand(us)
 c. 767-c.769: Saint Erembert (or Erambertus)
 Saint Wulfrède (Vulfredus)
 Antalfrède (Antalfridus, Amalsindus)
 Bertolinus (Bethelmus)
 Odovinus (Odonius, Idoinus)
 Adelbert (Adalbertus)
 Renaut (Ragnaldus, Reginaldus)
 813-816: Ermenon (or Erminus)
 829-838: Gottfried I (or Godofredus)
 840-871: Herpoin (or Herpuinus)
 871-897: Aubert (Hadebertus, Audebertus)
 899 or 900-909: Otfrid (or Othfredus)
 918 or 923-936: Adelelone (or Adelelmus)
 937-?: Bernuin(us)
 Guntbertus (?)
 c. 948: Ivo I. (or Yves)
 965 or 972: Constance (or Constantius)
 987 or 989-993: Eudes I. (or Odo)
 996 or 998: Robert I. (or Robertus)

1000 to 1300
 1015: Raoul I. (or Rodulph(us))
 1021 or 1022-1027: Guy I. le Bon (or Guido)
 1029: Raoul II. (or Rodulphus)
 1030-1042: Guy II. (or Guido)
 1043-1053: Frotland(us) I.
 1058: Guy III. (or Guido)
 1059-1067: Frotland(us) II.
 1067 or 1068-1069: Eudes II. (or Odo)
 1072 or 1074-1075: Rolland(us)
 1075 or 1076: Ingelran (or Ingelardus)
 1076 or 1077-1079: Ivo II. (or Yves)
 1081 or 1082-1093: Ursion (or Ursio or Ursus), Chancellor of France
 1093 or 1094-1095: Hugo (or Hugues)
 1095 or 1097-1099: Liétaud (or Letaldus)
 1099-1115: Hubert(us)
 1115 or 1117-1133: Clérembaut (or Clarembaldus)
 1134-8. April 1151: Pierre I. (or Petrus)
 1151-1154: Thibaud (or Theobaldus)
 1155 or 1156-1167: Amaury (or Amauricus)
 1168 or 1169-1185: Henri(cus)
 1185-1213: Geoffroy II. (or Gaufridus)
 1213 or 1214-18. April 1227: Guérin (or Garinus), Chancellor of France
 1227 or 1228-20. August 1258: Adam de Chambly
 1259-1 October 1260: Robert II. de La Houssaye
 1260-1283: Robert III. de Cressonsart
 1287-1288: Gautier de Chambly et Nuilly (or Gualterus)
 1290 or 1291-1293 or 1294: Pierre II. Cailleau (or Petrus Cailleu or Chaillou)
 1292 or 1294-9 May 1308: Guy IV. de Plailly (or Guido)

1300-1500
 1308 or 1309-1313: Guillaume I. de Baron (or Guilielmus de Berrone)
 5 November 1314 – 1334: Pierre III. de Baron (or Petrus Barrière)
 c. 1335-1337: Vast de Villiers (Vedastus de Villaribus)
 1337-1339: Etienne de Villiers (Stephanus de Villaribus)
 1339-27. August 1344: Robert IV. de Plailly
 31. August 1344 – 1349: Pierre IV. de Cros
 1349-1351: Denys I. le Grand (or Dionysus)
 1351-1356: Pierre V. de Treigny
 c. 1356 (?): Pierre VI. de Proverville (?)
 1356-1377: Adam de Nemours
 c. 1377-c. 1379: Martin (oder Martinus)
 c. 1379-c. 1380: Pierre VII. (or Petrus)
 1380-8 September 1409: Jean I. Dieudonné (Joannes Dodieu)
 2 October 1409 – 11 April 1415: Peter Plaoul, (Pierre Plaoul)
 10 May 1415 – 12 June 1418: Jean II d'Archery (Joannes Dachery)
 23 June 1418-23 November (?) 1422: Pierre IX. de Chissey
 14 May 1423 – 12 October 1429: Jean III. Fouquerel
 20. April 1432 or 1433-6. Mai 1434: Guillaume II de Hottot (or Guiliemus de Hotot)
 1434-1447: Jean IV. Raphanel
 4 May 1447 – 1496: Simon Bonnet
 26 September 1496 – 3 March 1499: Jean V. Neveu
 11. April 1499-29. August 1515: Charles de Blanchefort

From 1500
 1515-1517: Nicolas I. de Sains
 1 February 1517 – 1522: Jean VI. Calvi (or Joannes Calueau)
 1522-27 August 1526: Artus Fillon (or Arturius)
 1527: Oudart Hennequin (or Odardus)
 29 March 1528-8. December 1536: Guillaume III. Petit (or Guilielmus Parvi)
 8. January 1537-14. September 1559: René Le Roullier (or Renatus Le Rouillé)
 27 March 1560 – 13 June 1560: Crespin de Brichanteau (or Crispinus)
 17 July 1560 – 1561: Louis Guillart (or Ludovicus)
 19 September 1561 – 30 October 1583: Pierre X. Le Chevalier
 6 May 1584 – 1602: Guillaume IV Rose
 24 March 1602 – 15 March 1610: Antoine Rose
 1610-1622: Cardinal François de La Rochefoucauld
 19 September 1622 – 15 July 1652: Nicolas II Sanguin
 14 January 1653 – 13 March 1702: Denys II Sanguin (or Dionysus)
 16 April 1702-1. April 1714: Jean-François de Chamillart
 25 November 1714 – 4 January 1754: François-Firmin Trudaine (or Firminus)
 16 June 1754 – 21 September 1801: Jean-Armand de Bessuéjouls de Roquelaure

See also 
 Catholic Church in France
 List of Catholic dioceses in France

Notes

Bibliography

Sources
 pp. 548–549. (Use with caution; obsolete)
  p. 301. (in Latin)
 p. 175.

 p. 219.

Studies

 
Senlis
1801 disestablishments in France